Sweeney Todd is a 1928 British silent crime film directed by Walter West and starring Moore Marriott, Judd Green and Iris Darbyshire. It was adapted from a popular 1847 stage play by George Dibdin-Pitt called The String of Pearls, or The Fiend of Fleet Street, which in turn was based on an anonymous story called The String of Pearls: A Romance that was serialized in magazine format in 1846. This was the first time the story was adapted into a play, and it featured a surprise twist ending that doesn't appear in later stage versions of the Sweeney Todd legend. It was filmed entirely on set at Islington Studios.

Plot
A barber named Sweeney Todd slits the throats of his unsuspecting customers, robs them and then dumps their bodies down into his cellar through a trapdoor. He and his partner in crime, Mrs. Lovett, cut up the bodies and use the pieces to make meat pies which she then sells in her bakery shop. In the end, it all turns out to be just a bad dream.

Cast
 Moore Marriott - Sweeney Todd 
 Iris Darbyshire - Amelia Lovett 
 Judd Green - Simon Podge 
 Charles Ashton - Mark Ingestre 
 Zoe Palmer - Johanna 
 Philip Hewland - Ben Wagstaffe 
 Harry Lorraine - Mick Todd 
 Brian Glenny - Tobias Wragg

References

Bibliography
 Low, Rachel. The History of British Film: Volume IV, 1918–1929. Routledge, 1997.
 Wood, Linda. British Films, 1927-1939. British Film Institute, 1986.

External links

1928 films
British historical films
1920s historical films
Films directed by Walter West
British crime films
1928 crime films
British silent feature films
Films set in London
British films based on plays
Islington Studios films
Films set in the 18th century
Sweeney Todd
British black-and-white films
1920s English-language films
1920s British films